Marshall County Airport  is a public airport located three miles (5 km) south of the central business district of Moundsville, a city in Marshall County, West Virginia, United States. The airport is owned by the Marshall County Commission.

Although most U.S. airports use the same three-letter location identifier for the FAA and IATA, Marshall County Airport is assigned MPG by the FAA but has no designation from the IATA (which assigned MPG to Makini, Papua New Guinea).

Facilities and aircraft 
Situated in rugged mountain terrain, the airport site is a removed mountaintop with steep slopes to all sides. For the 12-month period ending December 31, 2006, the airport had 19,300 aircraft operations, an average of 52 per day: 97% general aviation, 3% military and <1% air taxi.

References

External links 
 Marshall County Airport at West Virginia Airport Directory
 

Airports in West Virginia
Transportation in Marshall County, West Virginia
Buildings and structures in Marshall County, West Virginia
Moundsville, West Virginia